

Events and publications

January
 January 19: Hergé's The Adventures of Jo, Zette and Jocko (1936-1957) debuts in Cœurs Vaillants.
 Famous Funnies #18 - Eastern Color
 More Fun the Big Comic Magazine (previously New Fun Comics) (1935 series) #7 - National Periodical Publications
 New Comics (1935 series) #2 - National Periodical Publications
 The Mickey Mouse comic strip adventure Mickey’s rival by Floyd Gottfredson runs in newspapers (Sunday tables). It marks the debut of Mortimer Mouse, five months in advance on his first apparition on the big screen.

February
 8 February: The first issue of Mickey Mouse Weekly (1936-1957) is published. 
 17 February: Lee Falk's The Phantom makes his debut.
 Famous Funnies #19 - Eastern Color
 More Fun the Big Comic Magazine (1935 series) #8 - National Periodical Publications
 New Comics (1935 series) #3 - National Periodical Publications
 Popular Comics #1 - Dell Comics

March
 March 8: Dudley D. Watkins' Oor Wullie and The Broons debut in The Sunday Post.
 March 16: In E.C. Segar's Thimble Theatre Eugene the Jeep makes its debut.
 March 31: Frans Piët signs his first Sjors comic strip. Originally a blatant copy of Martin Branner's Winnie Winkle it now becomes completely its own thing.
 Big Book of Fun Comics (1936 series) #1 - National Periodical Publications
 Famous Funnies #20 - Eastern Color
 More Fun Comics (previously More Fun the Big Comic Magazine) (1935 series) #9 - National Periodical Publications, cover dated "Mar-April"
 New Comics (1935 series) #4 - National Periodical Publications, cover dated "Mar-April".
 Popular Comics #2 - Dell Comics

April
 April 6: Lank Leonard's Mickey Finn (1936-1976) debuts.
 Famous Funnies #21 - Eastern Color
 King Comics #1 - David McKay Publications
 Popular Comics #3 - Dell Comics
 Tip Top Comics #1 - United Features: first comic book appearance of Tarzan

May
 May 2: In the first issue of the Turkish children's magazine Yavrutürk Çocuk Gazetesi Ercüment Kalmik's comics series Çetin Kaptan makes its debut.
 May 3: The first issue of the Flemish comics magazine Bravo ! is published. It will run until 17 April 1951. 
 May 7: The first issue of the Dutch comics magazine Doe Mee is published. It will run until 15 December 1949.
 May 15: A longer narrative unfolds in the otherwise gag-a-day comic Krazy Kat by George Herriman, lasting nearly 10 months, until 17 March 1937. Fans will later name this storyline the Tiger Tea story. 
 The Comics Magazine (Funny Pages) #1 — Centaur Publications
 Famous Funnies #22 - Eastern Color
 King Comics #2 - David McKay Publications
 More Fun Comics (1935 series) #10 - National Periodical Publications
 Popular Comics #4 - Dell Comics

June
 The Comics Magazine (Funny Pages) #2 — Centaur Publications
 Famous Funnies #23 - Eastern Color
 King Comics #3 - David McKay Publications
 New Comics (1935 series) #5 - National Periodical Publications

 Popular Comics #5 - Dell Comics
 Tip Top Comics #2 - United Features
 Phantom comic #1

July
 July 11: The final issue of the Dutch satirical magazine De Notenkraker is published.
 14 July: The Italian humor magazine Bertoldo brings out its first issue, continuing its run until 10 September 1943. 
 The Comics Magazine (Funny Pages) #3 — Centaur Publications
 Famous Funnies #24 - Eastern Color
 King Comics #4 - David McKay Publications
 More Fun Comics (1935 series) #11 - National Periodical Publications
 New Comics (1935 series) #6 - National Periodical Publications
 Popular Comics #6 - Dell Comics
 Tip Top Comics #3 - United Features

August
 August 30: Al Taliaferro and Earl Duvall adapt Donald Duck into a weekly pantomime comic, as part of their Silly Symphony comic strip.
 August 31: William St. John Glenn creates Dorothea in The Daily Mail.
Max Plaisted's Zarnak makes its debut. It will run until October 1937.
 The Comics Magazine (Funny Pages) #4 — Centaur Publications
 Famous Funnies #25 - Eastern Color
 King Comics #5 - David McKay Publications
 More Fun Comics (1935 series) #12 - National Periodical Publications
 New Comics (1935 series) #7 - National Periodical Publications
 Popular Comics #7 - Dell Comics
 Tip Top Comics #4 - United Features

September
 The Comics Magazine (Funny Pages) #5 — Centaur Publications
 Famous Funnies #26 - Eastern Color
 King Comics #6 - David McKay Publications
 More Fun Comics (1935 series) #13 - National Periodical Publications
 New Comics (1935 series) #8 - National Periodical Publications
 Popular Comics #8 - Dell Comics
 Tip Top Comics #5 - United Features

October
 October 25: The final episode of Rea Irvin's The Smythes is published in  The New York Herald Tribune.
 The first episode of Fuku-Chan by Ryuichi Yokoyama is published and will run until 1971.
 Famous Funnies #27 - Eastern Color
 The Funnies #1 - Dell Comics
 King Comics #7 - David McKay Publications
 More Fun Comics (1935 series) #14 - National Periodical Publications
 New Comics (1935 series) #9 - National Periodical Publications
 Popular Comics #9 - Dell Comics
 Tip Top Comics #6 - United Features

November
 November 30: The first episode of the Mickey Mouse story Island in the sky, by Floyd Gottfredson and Ted Osborne is published, which marks the debut of Doctor Einmug. 
Famous Funnies #28 - Eastern Color
 The Funnies #2 - Dell Comics
 Funny Pages #6 — Centaur Publications
 Funny Picture Stories #1 — Centaur Publications. This issue also marks the debut of The Clock by George Brenner.
 King Comics #8 - David McKay Publications
 More Fun Comics (1935 series) #15 - National Periodical Publications
 New Comics (1935 series) #10 - National Periodical Publications
 Popular Comics #10 - Dell Comics
 Elmer Woggon and Allen Saunders's Steve Roper and Mike Nomad (1936-2004) debuts. 
 Tip Top Comics #7 - United Features

December
 Detective Picture Stories #1 — Centaur Publications
 Famous Funnies #29 - Eastern Color
 Flash Gordon Strange Adventure Magazine #1. It folds after only one issue.
 The Funnies #3 - Dell Comics
 Funny Pages #7 — Centaur Publications
 Funny Picture Stories #2 — Centaur Publications
 King Comics #9 - David McKay Publications
 More Fun Comics (1935 series) #16 - National Periodical Publications
 New Comics (1935 series) #11 - National Periodical Publications
 Popular Comics #11 - Dell Comics
 Tip Top Comics #8 - United Features

Specific date unknown
 Harry Paschall creates Bosco for Strength and Health magazine, where it will run until his death.
 Jerry Iger and Will Eisner establish the comics studio Eisner & Iger.
 Roberto Sgrilli's Formichino debuts.
 The final episode of Felix Hess' long-running comic series Uit Het Kladschrift van Jantje is published.

Births

January
 January 5: Birago Balzano, Italian cartoonist (Zora), (d. 2022).

August
 August 11: Mitsutoshi Furuya, Japanese comic artist (Dame Oyaji, Bar Lemon Heart), (d. 2021).

September
 September 2: Vlastimil Zábranský, Czech painter, visual artist and comics artist, (d. 2021).

November
 November 3: Takao Saito, Japanese comics/manga artist (Golgo 13, Kage Gari, Barom-1), (d. 2021).

Deaths

January
 January 31: Grace Drayton, American illustrator and comics artist (Dolly Dimples, The Pussycat Princess), dies at the age of 58.

March
 March 19: Ottilia Adelborg, Swedish illustrator and comics artist, dies at age 80.

April
 April 2: Bert Cobb, American comics artist (Jocko the Educated Monk, Some Monkey Fun From Jungle Jinks, Stumble-Toe Joe, Ambitious Teddy, Meddlesome Millie), dies at age 66 or 67.

May
 May 5: James Francis Sullivan, British illustrator and comics artist (The British Working Man, The Queer Side of Things), dies at age 83.
 May 9 : Stanislav Lolek, Czech illustrator and comics artist (The Cunning Little Vixen or Vixen Sharp Ears) dies at the age of 62.

July
 July 3: Charles Reese, American comics artist (made various short-lived newspaper comics), dies at age 74.
 July 19: Apeles Mestres, Spanish musician, novelist, illustrator and comics artist (made some sequential illustrations), dies at age 81.

Specific date unknown
 Ed Leffingwell, American comics artist (Little Joe), dies.
 Charles Small, American comics artist (continued Salesman Sam), passes away.
 Pál Spanyár, Hungarian painter, cartoonist and drawing teacher (13th District Secondary School), passes away at age 61 or 62.

Exhibitions and shows

Conventions

First issues by title
Big Book of Fun Comics (March, National Periodical Publications)
The Comics Magazine (Funny Pages) (May, Centaur Publications)
The Funnies (October, Dell Comics)
King Comics (April, David McKay Publications)
Popular Comics (February, Dell Comics)
Tip Top Comics (April, United Features)

Initial appearances by character name
Clock, by George Brenner, in Funny Pages #6 and Funny Picture Stories #1 (November) - Centaur Publications

Comics debuts without a specific date
 Barney Baxter by Frank Miller.
 Belinda by Steve Dowling.
 Ben Bowyang by Alex Gurney.
 Biffen och Bananen by Rit-Ola
 Laff-a-Day debuts.
 Rebo by Cesare Zavattini (plot), Federico Pedrocchi (script) and Giovanni Scolari (art)
 Room and Board by Gene Ahern.

Sources